En Purushan Kuzhandhai Maadhiri is a 2001 Tamil language comedy film directed by S. P. Rajkumar. The film stars Livingston, Devayani and Vindhya in lead roles. The music was composed by Deva. The film was released in 2001 with mixed reviews from critics. The film was remade in Telugu as Maa Ayana Chanti Pilladu.

Plot
Murugesan (Livingston) is a rich landlord in a village but is illiterate as well as innocent. He is in love with his cousin Maheshwari (Devayani) right from childhood. Maheshwari also likes Murugesan but she wants him to overcome his innocence and be brave. Santhamoorthy (Ponnambalam) is Murugesan's half brother and enmity prevails between him and Murugesan. Chinthamani (Vindhya) is a dancer who comes to Murugesan's village to perform. Chinthamani's mother forces her into prostitution but Murugesan saves her and accommodates in his farm house.

Murugesan and Maheshwari's wedding is fixed and the day before wedding, Santhamoorthy tries to kill Murugesan but Murugesan fights back the goons. Murugesan who is drunk now rushes to his farmhouse to get some weapons to kill Santhamoorthy. Chinthamani who lives in the farm house tries to stop Murugesan from committing the murder and accidentally they enter into a physical relationship. Murugesan feels guilty of the incident and wants to cancel his wedding with Maheshwari. But Maheshwari's father (R. Sundarajan) convinces Murugesan to not cancel the wedding.

Maheshwari and Chinthamani both get pregnant now. Chinthamani wants to abort her child and visits an elder lady, but Santhamoorthy plays trick by changing the medicine so that the child grows well. Chinthamani feels bad that Murugesan's life is at stake because of her. But Murugesan understands that it was his fault too and takes care of Chinathamani as well. One day, Maheshwari finds out the truth and quarrels with Murugesan.

Both Maheshwari and Chinthamani give birth to baby boys. Santhamoorthy plans to kill Maheshwari's baby, but Chinthamani interrupts and saves the baby. During the fight, Chinathamani falls from a mountain and dies in the process of saving Maheshwari's baby. Maheshwari now realizes Chinthamani's kind heart. Murugesan and Maheshwari take care of both the babies now. Santhamoorthy also realizes his mistake and bonds with Murugesan.

Cast
Livingston as Murugesan
Devayani as Maheswari
Vindhya as Sinthamani
Vadivelu as Angusaamy
R. Sundarrajan as Maheswari's dad
Ponnambalam as Santhamoorthy
Vinu Chakravarthy as Pazhanisamy
C. R. Saraswathi 
Mayilsamy
Muthukaalai

Soundtrack
Lyrics were written by Kamakodiyan, Kalaikumar, 'Karupur' Ramu and S. P. Rajkumar.

Critical reception
Sr Ashok Kumar of The Hindu wrote "The director must have taken care to give sufficient reason to get his protagonist involved with another woman, a day before his marriage. But the justification given for this and also for a couple of other reactions, are not acceptable". Balaji B wrote "While the topic of the wayward husband lends itself to comedy, the plight of the women is not be taken lightly. Directors who stick to one tone throughout seem to be more successful while those who try to offer up a mixture of the two end up delivering neither satisfactorily. S.P.Rajakumar chooses to take the latter path and the final verdict is the same - the movie struggles between being a light comedy and a serious tearjerker". Chennai Online wrote "The plot did have the potential to make it an engaging entertainer. But the problem is that the director couldn't really decide as to what type of treatment he should give his plot. Whether it should be in the genre of a comedy or a melodrama, of a family sentiment or of a saga of a family feud. So he makes a hotchpotch of the whole thing, and it does not help matters".

References

External links

Tamil films remade in other languages
2001 films
2000s Tamil-language films
Indian comedy-drama films
Films scored by Deva (composer)
Films directed by S. P. Rajkumar